Anthony Walsh may refer to:

 Anthony Walsh (cyclist), cyclist from New Zealand
 Anthony Walsh (criminologist), American criminologist

See also
Tony Walsh (disambiguation)